Iván Miranda was the defending champion; however, he lost in the second round to Benjamin Becker.
Santiago Giraldo won in the final over Michael Russell, 6–3, 6–2.

Seeds

Draw

Final four

Top half

Bottom half

External links
Draw

Challenger Salinas Diario Expreso
2009 Singles